The 2010 WNBA season is the 11th season for the Indiana Fever of the Women's National Basketball Association.

Transactions

Dispersal draft
Based on the Fever's 2009 record, they would pick 11th in the Sacramento Monarchs dispersal draft. The Fever waived their pick.

WNBA Draft
The following are the Fever's selections in the 2010 WNBA Draft.

Transaction log
February 16: The Fever signed Eshaya Murphy, Lyndra Littles and Josephine Owino to training camp contracts.
February 19: The Fever re-signed Jessica Moore and Jessica Davenport.
February 25: The Fever signed Jennifer Risper to a training camp contract.
April 23: The Fever signed Ashley Battle, Michelle Campbell and Meredith Marsh to training camp contracts.
April 30: The Fever waived Lyndra Littles and Armelie Lumanu.
May 6: The Fever waived Jennifer Risper, Meredith Marsh and Michelle Campbell.
May 13: The Fever waived Josephine Owino and Ashley Battle.
May 14: The Fever waived Joy Cheek and Christina Wirth.
May 27: The Fever acquired Shavonte Zellous from the Tulsa Shock in exchange for a second-round pick in the 2011 Draft.
July 11: The Fever waived Eshaya Murphy and signed Joy Cheek.

Trades

Free agents

Additions

Subtractions

Roster

Depth

Season standings

Schedule

Preseason

|- align="center" bgcolor="bbffbb"
| 1 || May 7 || 12:00pm || Chicago || 69-63 || Murphy (20) || Owino (11) || Battle (4) || Conseco Fieldhouse  7,291 || 1-0
|- align="center" bgcolor="ffbbbb"
| 2 || May 10 || 12:30pm || @ Chicago || 71-84 || Murphy (15) || Davenport (8) || Bevilaqua, January (4) || Allstate Arena  N/A || 1-1
|-

Regular season

|- align="center" bgcolor="ffbbbb"
| 1 || May 15 || 7:00pm || Washington ||  || 65-72 || Catchings, Sutton-Brown (12) || Sutton-Brown (6) || January (5)  || Conseco Fieldhouse  9,752 || 0-1
|- align="center" bgcolor="ffbbbb"
| 2 || May 16 || 7:00pm || @ Atlanta || SSO || 62-66 || Catchings (18) || Sutton-Brown (9) || Douglas (6) || Philips Arena  7,337 || 0-2
|- align="center" bgcolor="bbffbb"
| 3 || May 22 || 8:00pm || @ Chicago || CN100 || 92-86 (OT) || Catchings (28) || Murphy (10) || Douglas, Murphy (6) || Allstate Arena  6,477 || 1-2
|- align="center" bgcolor="bbffbb"
| 4 || May 23 || 6:00pm || Chicago || FS-ICN100 || 69-61 || Murphy (16) || Murphy (9) || Douglas (4) || Conseco Fieldhouse  7,665 || 2-2
|- align="center" bgcolor="ffbbbb"
| 5 || May 29 || 8:00pm || @ Tulsa || FS-OK || 74-79 || Catchings (15) || Catchings (10) || Catchings (7) || BOK Center  4,005 || 2-3
|-

|- align="center" bgcolor="bbffbb"
| 6 || June 3 || 7:00pm || San Antonio || FS-IFS-SW || 79-57 || Douglas (22) || Catchings (7) || Bevilaqua, Zellous (3) || Conseco Fieldhouse  7,574 || 3-3
|- align="center" bgcolor="bbffbb"
| 7 || June 5 || 7:00pm || New York ||  || 78-73 || Zellous (23) || Sutton-Brown (8) || Catchings (9) || Conseco Fieldhouse  8,090 || 4-3
|- align="center" bgcolor="bbffbb"
| 8 || June 6 || 7:00pm || @ Minnesota || FS-N || 89-51 || Catchings (27) || Murphy (8) || Bevilaqua, Moore, Zellous (2) || Target Center  6,444 || 5-3
|- align="center" bgcolor="ffbbbb"
| 9 || June 11 || 7:30pm || @ Connecticut ||  || 77-86 || Davenport (18) || Catchings (8) || Douglas (6) || Mohegan Sun Arena  7,603 || 5-4
|- align="center" bgcolor="bbffbb"
| 10 || June 13 || 6:00pm || Connecticut ||  || 77-67 || Douglas (20) || Catchings (13) || Douglas (3) || Conseco Fieldhouse  7,302 || 6-4
|- align="center" bgcolor="bbffbb"
| 11 || June 17 || 7:00pm || Seattle || FS-I || 72-65 || Douglas (15) || Sutton-Brown (7) || Douglas (4) || Conseco Fieldhouse  7,520 || 7-4
|- align="center" bgcolor="bbffbb"
| 12 || June 19 || 7:00pm || Atlanta ||  || 94-91 || Castro Marques, McCoughtry (21) || Lyttle (20) || McCoughtry (5) || Conseco Fieldhouse  8,187 || 8-4
|- align="center" bgcolor="ffbbbb"
| 13 || June 25 || 10:00pm || @ Seattle ||  || 81-85 || Douglas (29) || Catchings (5) || Catchings (5) || KeyArena  9,083 || 8-5
|- align="center" bgcolor="bbffbb"
| 14 || June 27 || 6:00pm || @ Chicago || CN100 || 70-64 || Hoffman (13) || Catchings (6) || Catchings, Douglas (4) || Allstate Arena  4,051 || 9-5
|- align="center" bgcolor="ffbbbb"
| 15 || June 29 || 7:00pm || @ Washington || ESPN2 || 65-68 || Catchings (17) || Catchings, Douglas, Hoffman (4) || Douglas (5) || Verizon Center  8,464 || 9-6
|-

|- align="center" bgcolor="bbffbb"
| 16 || July 6 || 8:00pm || @ Chicago || CN100 || 58-51 || Catchings (16) || Sutton-Brown (10) || January (5) || Allstate Arena  3,732 || 10-6
|- align="center" bgcolor="bbffbb"
| 17 || July 8 || 7:00pm || Tulsa ||  || 100-72 || Catchings (24) || Sutton-Brown (7) || January (6) || Conseco Fieldhouse  7,077 || 11-6
|- align="center" bgcolor="ffbbbb"
| 18 || July 14 || 1:00pm || Connecticut ||  || 68-77 || Catchings (22) || Catchings (9) || Bevilaqua, January (3) || Conseco Fieldhouse  10,076 || 11-7
|- align="center" bgcolor="bbffbb"
| 19 || July 16 || 7:00pm || Atlanta ||  || 89-70 || Catchings (23) || Catchings (11) || Catchings, Douglas, January (4) || Conseco Fieldhouse  7,532 || 12-7
|- align="center" bgcolor="bbffbb"
| 20 || July 18 || 4:00pm || @ New York || MSG || 84-81 (OT) || Catchings (22) || Catchings (10) || Catchings (7) || Madison Square Garden  9,508 || 13-7
|- align="center" bgcolor="bbffbb"
| 21 || July 22 || 7:00pm || Los Angeles || ESPN2 || 76-57 || Hoffman (16) || Hoffman (8) || Catchings (6) || Conseco Fieldhouse  7,898 || 14-7
|- align="center" bgcolor="bbffbb"
| 22 || July 24 || 7:00pm || @ Washington || NBATVCSN-MA || 78-73 || January (19) || Catchings, Sutton-Brown (5) || January (8) || Verizon Center  9,786 || 15-7
|- align="center" bgcolor="bbffbb"
| 23 || July 27 || 7:00pm || Chicago || CN100 || 78-74 || Catchings (16) || Catchings (10) || Catchings (6) || Conseco Fieldhouse  6,853 || 16-7
|- align="center" bgcolor="ffbbbb"
| 24 || July 30 || 7:00pm || Washington ||  || 73-77 || Catchings, Douglas (16) || 4 players (4) || Catchings (7) || Conseco Fieldhouse  8,207 || 16-8
|-

|- align="center" bgcolor="ffbbbb"
| 25 || August 1 || 3:00pm || @ Atlanta || NBATVSSO || 74-90 || Catchings (24) || Davenport (12) || January (4) || Philips Arena  6,270 || 16-9
|- align="center" bgcolor="ffbbbb"
| 26 || August 3 || 7:00pm || New York || FS-I || 72-82 || Catchings (19) || Catchings (6) || Douglas, January (2) || Conseco Fieldhouse  7,540 || 16-10
|- align="center" bgcolor="bbffbb"
| 27 || August 6 || 7:00pm || Atlanta ||  || 95-93 || Catchings (30) || Catchings (8) || Douglas (5) || Conseco Fieldhouse  9,214 || 17-10
|- align="center" bgcolor="bbffbb"
| 28 || August 8 || 6:00pm || @ Phoenix ||  || 104-82 || Douglas (28) || Catchings (10) || Douglas (6) || US Airways Center  10,995 || 18-10
|- align="center" bgcolor="bbffbb"
| 29 || August 10 || 10:00pm || @ Los Angeles || ESPN2 || 82-76 || Sutton-Brown (18) || Catchings (11) || Bevilaqua (6) || STAPLES Center  10,586 || 19-10
|- align="center" bgcolor="bbffbb"
| 30 || August 13 || 7:00pm || Phoenix ||  || 110-90 || Catchings (29) || Catchings (7) || Catchings (6) || Conseco Fieldhouse  10,002 || 20-10
|- align="center" bgcolor="bbffbb"
| 31 || August 15 || 5:00pm || @ Connecticut ||  || 79-66 || Catchings (26) || Catchings (7) || Catchings (7) || Mohegan Sun Arena  7,915 || 21-10
|- align="center" bgcolor="ffbbbb"
| 32 || August 17 || 7:30pm || @ New York ||  || 57-78 || Catchings (25) || Catchings, Sutton-Brown (5) || Catchings (3) || Madison Square Garden  8,953 || 21-11
|- align="center" bgcolor="ffbbbb"
| 33 || August 20 || 8:00pm || @ San Antonio ||  || 61-75 || Catchings (15) || Catchings (7) || Catchings (4) || AT&T Center  10,807 || 21-12
|- align="center" bgcolor="ffbbbb"
| 34 || August 22 || 5:00pm || Minnesota || NBATVFS-I || 79-83 (OT) || Catchings (17) || Catchings (14) || January (7) || Conseco Fieldhouse  10,015 || 21-13
|-

| All games are viewable on WNBA LiveAccess

Postseason

|- align="center" bgcolor="ffbbbb"
| 1 || August 26 || 7:00pm || @ New York || NBATVMSG || 73-85 || Catchings (18) || Davenport (8) || Catchings (6) || Madison Square Garden  14,624 || 0-1 
|- align="center" bgcolor="bbffbb"
| 2 || August 29 || 8:00pm || New York || ESPN2 || 75-67 || Catchings (17) || Catchings (13) || Douglas (5) || Conseco Fieldhouse  7,535 || 1-1 
|- align="center" bgcolor="ffbbbb"
| 3 || September 1 || 7:30pm || @ New York || NBATVMSG || 74-77 || Douglas (24) || Catchings (6) || Douglas (4) || Madison Square Garden  16,682 || 1-2 
|-

Statistics

Regular season

Postseason

Awards and honors
Tamika Catchings was named WNBA Eastern Conference Player of the Week for the week of July 10, 2010.
Tamika Catchings was named WNBA Eastern Conference Player of the Week for the week of July 31, 2010.
Tamika Catchings was named WNBA Eastern Conference Player of the Month for July.
Tamika Catchings was named to the 2010 WNBA All-Star Team as a Team USA starter.
Katie Douglas was named to the 2010 WNBA All-Star Team as a WNBA reserve.
Tamika Catchings was named to the All-Defensive First Team.
Tully Bevilaqua was named to the All-Defensive Second Team.
Katie Douglas was named to the All-Defensive Second Team.
Tamika Catchings was named Defensive Player of the Year.
Tamika Catchings was awarded the Kim Perrot Sportsmanship Award.
Tamika Catchings was named to the All-WNBA First Team.
Katie Douglas was named to the All-WNBA Second Team.

References

External links

Indiana Fever seasons
Indiana
Indiana Fever